Frontwave Credit Union is a not-for-profit credit union that is chartered and regulated under the authority of the National Credit Union Administration (NCUA) of the U.S. federal government.

Frontwave Credit Union is based in Southern California with branch locations in Oceanside, San Marcos, San Diego, Escondido, Wildomar, Temecula, Barstow, and Yucca Valley. They also have branches aboard MCB Camp Pendleton, MCRD San Diego, and MCAGCC 29-Palms.

Frontwave Credit Union, as of 2022, has more than 1.2 billion in assets and 117,000 members.

Membership
Frontwave Credit Union is owned and governed by its members. Like all credit unions, they have a field of membership that designates who may join. To qualify for membership one must live, work, or worship in San Diego County, Riverside County, or San Bernardino County, or be an immediate family member of a current Frontwave Credit Union member. Also, per the NCUA's by law of "once a member, always a member" membership with Frontwave Credit Union may continue should the member decide to relocate.

Services
Like other financial institutions, Frontwave Credit Union offers products that include savings accounts, checking accounts, certificates, consumer loans, mortgages, home equities, lines of credit, credit cards, online banking, as well as some small business services.  Frontwave Credit Union also offers investment services, an electronic trading platform, and insurance through Frontwave Financial Group.

As a financial cooperative, Frontwave Credit Union offers access to nearly 30,000 surcharge-free ATMs nationwide, 9,000+ of which are deposit taking. In addition, there are nearly 5,000 credit union branches and over 2,000 self-service locations through the shared branching network.

Frontwave Credit Union is a full-service financial institution that offers a wide array of products and services through their official website or by visiting any branch location.

History

Founded in 1952, Frontwave Credit Union began aboard MCB Camp Pendleton and was originally chartered as Camp Pendleton Federal Credit Union. The initial charter was for membership of active and retired civil service employees.
In 1955 the charter was expanded to include active and retired military personnel.
In 1965 the credit union merged with Naval Ammunition Depot Federal Credit Union.
In 1968 a merger took place with 29 Palms Credit Union.
In 1975 the name changed to Marine Corps West Federal Credit Union, and a new headquarters was constructed aboard MCB Camp Pendleton.
In 1980 a merger with Marine Corps Recruit Depot occurred.
In 1982 they merged with Barstow Community Federal Credit Union. They also added the U.S. National Training Center at Fort Irwin to their charter.
In 1995 the credit union assumed administrative management of the Recruit Direct Deposit Program. The program was so successful that the credit union was awarded the "Golden Hammer Award" in 1997 by Vice President Al Gore for reducing government waste.
In 2002 the credit union changed from a Federally Chartered to a State Chartered (Community) credit union, which included the counties of San Diego and San Bernardino. This is also when the name was changed to Pacific Marine Credit Union (PMCU).
In 2004 Riverside County was added to the field of membership.
In 2010 the credit union moved their headquarters from MCB Camp Pendleton to Oceanside.
In 2018 the credit union changed their name from Pacific Marine Credit Union to Frontwave Credit Union.

Notes

Credit unions based in California
Non-profit organizations based in San Diego
Companies based in San Diego
Economy of Riverside, California
San Bernardino, California